Narito Namizato (born August 7, 1989) is a Japanese professional basketball player for Gunma Crane Thunders of the B.League. In 2008 Namizato won the "Slam Dunk Scholarship" funded by Takehiko Inoue, and played in America. He is one of the league-leading  premier passers.

Basketball shoes
He prefers  sturdy materials and hard rubber for basketball shoes (Asics).

Personal
His brother Tasuku played for the Kumamoto Volters of the B.League.

Career statistics

|-
| style="background-color:#afe6ba" align="left" | 2009-10
| align="left" | Tochigi
| 18 || 0 || 4.9 || 43.3 || 0.0 || 66.7 || 0.7 || 0.7 || 0.1 || 0.0 || 2.3
|-
| align="left" | 2010-11
| align="left" | Tochigi
| 10 || 0 || 7.4 || 30.8 || 14.3 || 44.4 || 0.8 || 1.0 || 0.1 || 0.0 ||  2.1
|-
| style="background-color:#afe6ba" align="left" | 2011-12
| align="left" | Ryukyu
| 52 || 40 || 27.2 || 41.7 || 30.4 || 64.2 || 4.1 || 4.2 || 1.2 || 0.1 ||  11.0
|-
| align="left" | 2012-13
| align="left" | Ryukyu
| 50 || 49 || 29.0 || 37.8 || 26.7 || 72.3 || 4.8 || 6.2 || 1.5 || 0.1 ||  11.5
|-
| style="background-color:#afe6ba" align="left" | 2013-14
| align="left" | Ryukyu
| 16 || 0 || 20.2 || 29.7 || 28.6 || 70.0 || 2.4 || 2.9 || 1.0 || 0.1 ||  5.0
|-
| align="left" | 2014-15
| align="left" | Ryukyu
| 52 || 3 || 21.7 || 38.4 || 33.3 || 74.1 || 3.1 || 3.0 || 0.8 || 0.1 ||  7.8
|-
| align="left" | 2015-16
| align="left" | Osaka
| 52 || 25 || 24.6 || 39.5 || 25.6 || 70.9 || 3.2 || 4.3 || 1.3 || 0.1 ||  8.0
|-
| align="left" | 2016-17
| align="left" | Shiga
|46 || 32 ||25.0 || 37.9||27.1 ||70.4  || 3.5 || 4.2 ||1.0  ||0.1  ||9.9 
|-
| align="left" | 2017-18
| align="left" | Shiga
|59 || 59 ||27.9 || 40.0||29.0 ||79.1  || 3.2 || 7.4 ||1.5  ||0.0  ||12.2 
|-
| align="left" | 2018-19
| align="left" | Ryukyu
|57 || 49 ||23.0 || 45.3||23.5||78.4  || 2.5 || 6.4 ||0.9  ||0.1  ||8.9 
|-

References

External links 
RealGM profile
 
 

1989 births
Living people
Utsunomiya Brex players
Osaka Evessa players
Ryukyu Golden Kings players
Shiga Lakes players
South Kent School alumni
Sportspeople from Okinawa Prefecture